Ameln may refer to:

Places
Ameln, a district of the Municipality of Titz, North Rhine-Westphalia, Germany

People with the surname
Haakon Ameln (1881–1949), Norwegian businessperson
Henrik Ameln (1879–1961), Norwegian jurist and politician
Johan Gerhard Theodor Ameln (1838–1917), Norwegian merchant and politician
Karl-Robert Ameln (1919–2016), Swedish sailor and Olympian